Nagia dentiscripta is a species of moth in the family Erebidae first described by Alice Ellen Prout in 1921. It is found in Central Africa.

References

Nagia
 Moths described in 1921
 Moths of Africa